The Chicago and Northwestern Railroad Depot was built by the Chicago and Northwestern Railroad (C&NW) in 1924. It is located at the east end of the business district in Beresford, South Dakota. The long rectangular depot is constructed of concrete, brick, and stucco on frame. The building consists of a freight room, the gentleman's waiting room, the washrooms and ticket office, and the ladies' waiting room.

The C&NW first entered Beresford in 1884. The current depot opened 1924 as a replacement for the previous smaller depot. At the peak of rail service, there were two freight and four passenger trains running on a daily basis.

The depot was listed in the National Register of Historic Places because of its architecture and also because of its association with the development of Beresford.

References
McGill, Michael. Chicago and Northwestern Railroad Depot at Beresford National Register of Historic Places Registration Form, National Park Service, Washington, DC, 1984.

Railway stations on the National Register of Historic Places in South Dakota
Beresford, South Dakota
Railway stations in the United States opened in 1924
Transportation in Union County, South Dakota
National Register of Historic Places in Union County, South Dakota
Former railway stations in South Dakota